Privolnoye is a rural locality (a selo) in Krasnogvardeysky District of Stavropol Krai, Russia, located on the Yegorlyk River. Population:

History
A paternal family house in Privolnoye was the birthplace of former Soviet president Mikhail Gorbachev.

Notable people
 Mikhail Gorbachev, General Secretary of the Communist Party of the Soviet Union (1985–1991), President of the Soviet Union (1990–1991) was born on 2 March 1931 in Privolnoye. As a child, Gorbachev (1931-2022) grew up in the aftermath of the Soviet famine of 1932–1933. He recalled in a memoir that "In that terrible year [in 1933] nearly half the population of my native village, Privolnoye, starved to death, including two sisters and one brother of my father."

Notable places
At Krasnogvardeiskoye, a village 15 kilometers from Privolnoye, in the modest three-story building displays a metal plaque commemorates Gorbachev's former high school.

In popular culture

 Vitaly Mansky's 2001 documentary Gorbachev: After Empire

References

Rural localities in Stavropol Krai